The Assembly of Year XIII was a meeting called by the Second Triumvirate governing the young republic of the United Provinces of the Río de la Plata (modern-day Argentina, Uruguay, part of Bolivia) on October 1812.

One of the objectives of the assembly was to define an institutional government system for the republic. Without the presence of representatives from some of the provinces (such as the Oriental Province), it was inaugurated on January 31, 1813 (hence the name). At the same time, it was to proclaim independence from Spain, and write the first constitution of the young state.

Accomplishments

During the assembly, different interests delayed the declaration of independence, but a number of common points were successfully established:
 The national coat of arms was chosen.
 The national anthem was commended.
 The Freedom of Wombs (Libertad de vientres) law, which put an end to slavery, was passed (it dictated that children born from slaves since the passing of the law were automatically free citizens).
 All titles of nobility (from the colonial period) were voided and suppressed.
 The creation of the national currency was ordered.
 The Spanish Inquisition and the practice of torture were abolished.
 A statute was approved that replaced as Executive Power the Second Triumvirate for a unipersonal Supreme Directorship.

See also
Argentine War of Independence
Instructions of the Year XIII
United Provinces of the Río de la Plata

Argentine War of Independence
Argentine historical congresses
1813 in Argentina
Defunct unicameral legislatures
1815 disestablishments